Hiroshima is an American band formed in 1974 that incorporates Japanese instruments in its music. Hiroshima has sold over four million albums around the world.

Biography
Dan Kuramoto, Hiroshima's leader, is from East Los Angeles. He attended California State University, Long Beach, then led its Asian-American studies department. Through playing in a band on weekends he met June Kuramoto, a native of Japan who grew up in Los Angeles and played koto, a Japanese stringed instrument. Kuramoto admired Earth, Wind, and Fire for the way it combined jazz and R&B, and Santana for his identification with Latinos. He wanted to create a band that would represent Asian Americans. He named it after the Japanese city Hiroshima, which was mostly destroyed by an atomic weapon at the end of World War II.

Hiroshima's debut album sold more than 100,000 copies in its first three months. The band's second album yielded the song "Winds of Change", which received a Grammy Award nomination for Best R&B Instrumental. Hiroshima got its first gold album in 1985 with Another Place and the second with Go which followed it. The album Legacy was nominated for Best Pop Instrumental Album in 2010. Hiroshima has sold more than four million albums worldwide. In 1990, the band was the opening act for Miles Davis, and in 1988 they played with T-Square at the Hibiya Open-Air Concert Hall.

Hiroshima consists of Dan Kuramoto (saxophone, flute, keyboards, shakuhachi), June Kuramoto (koto), Kimo Cornwell (Keyboards), Dean Cortez (Bass guitar), and Danny Yamamoto (drums and taiko).

Awards and honors
Hiroshima was given the Visionary Award by East West Players, the oldest Asian Pacific American theatre company in the United States, for the band's "Impact on the Asian Pacific American (APA) community through their artistic excellence and support of the Asian Pacific American performing arts."

Members
 Dan Kuramoto (1974–present) (flute)
 June Kuramoto (1974–present) (koto)
 Danny Yamamoto (1974–present) (drums) (2019 tour) keyboards, taiko, percussion)
 Kimo Cornwell (present) (keyboards)
 Dean Cortez (present) (bass guitar)

Past
 Johnny Mori (1974–2003) 
 Peter Hata (guitar, 1974–1984)
 Dave Iwataki (keyboards, 1974–1977)
 Dane Matsumura (bass guitar, 1977–1980)
 John Shipley (keyboards, 1977-1978)
 Richard Matthews (1979-1980) (keyboards)
 Teri Kusumoto (vocals, 1977–1982)
 Jess Acuna (vocals, 1977–1982)
 Barbara Long (vocals, 1985 album Another Place, 1987 album Go)
 Margaret Sasaki-Taylor "Machun" (vocals, 1989 album East)
 Jeanette Clinger (vocals, 1992 album Providence)
 Teri Koide (vocals, 1994 album LA)
 Terry Steele (vocals, 1999 album Between Black & White)
 Shoji Kameda (taiko, throat singer, 2003-2016)

Discography

References

External links
Official website

American jazz ensembles from California
Jazz fusion ensembles
Smooth jazz ensembles
Koto players
American musicians of Japanese descent
Heads Up International artists
Epic Records artists
Qwest Records artists